Leon Allen "Goose" Goslin (October 16, 1900 – May 15, 1971) was an American professional baseball left fielder. He played in Major League Baseball for the Washington Senators, St. Louis Browns, and Detroit Tigers, from  until .

Goslin led the American League (AL) in triples two times and finished the season with a batting average of over .300 eleven times. He won the AL batting title in 1928 with a .379 batting average which set a Washington Senators record. He led the AL in assists five times, putouts four times and his 4,141 putouts and 181 assists as a left fielder are both 5th all time. His 173 triples are 22nd all time and his .316 batting average is 7th all time among left fielders with over 2,000 games played. A two time World Series winner, he was elected to the National Baseball Hall of Fame in 1968 via the Veterans Committee.

Early years
Born in Salem, New Jersey, Goslin was 16 when he left home to play on a touring semipro circuit of the Eastern seaboard, and by 19 had moved into the minor leagues in South Carolina as a pitcher. Goslin was discovered by famed scout Joe Engel. After hearing from Engel, Senators owner Clark Griffith personally scouted Goslin and attended a Sally League game in which Goslin was playing for Columbia, South Carolina. A fly ball hit Goslin on the head, and another barely missed him. Goslin hit three home runs in the game, and Griffith decided to take a chance on him.

Goslin's difficulty in judging fly balls contributed to his nickname "Goose." Opposing players said Goslin resembled a bird flapping its wings when he ran after a ball with his arms waving. However, one year during spring training, Goslin wandered to an adjacent field where a track and field team was working out. Goslin tried the shot put, and his throwing arm was never the same afterward.

The 20-year-old Goslin was called up to the major leagues to play for the Washington Senators for the last two weeks of the  season. Goslin played 93 games in 1922 and became a fixture for the Senators in left field until 1930. Showing speed on the base paths, Goslin led the American League with 18 triples in 1923.

1924 and 1925 World Series

In , Goslin established himself as one of the league's top run producers, as he led the American League with 129 RBIs and finished seventh in batting average (.344). At age 23, Goslin also hit for the cycle and was among the league leaders with 17 triples (second best), 299 total bases (fourth best) and 199 hits (fifth best). After the Senators had losing records in 1922 and 1923, Goslin helped to spark the team to a 92-win season and their first World Series championship in 1924. With a 36-year-old Walter Johnson contributing 23 wins and the young Goslin knocking in 129 runs (50 more RBI than any other player on the team), the Senators finished two games ahead of the Yankees and defeated the New York Giants in the 1924 World Series. Goslin hit .344 with three home runs, seven RBI and a .656 slugging percentage in that World Series. Goslin also set a World Series record in 1924 with six consecutive hits, spread across three games (3-5). That record was tied in 1976 by Thurman Munson and later broken in 1990 by Billy Hatcher, who had seven consecutive hits in that World Series.

Goslin contributed another strong performance to the 1925 Senators, batting .334, with 72 extra base hits and 113 RBI. His 20 triples led the American League. Once again, he batted in far more runs than any other Senators hitter – 26 more than Sam Rice. The Senators easily won their second consecutive pennant, finishing  games ahead of the Philadelphia Athletics. Despite Goslin's three home runs, six RBI and a .692 slugging percentage in the 1925 World Series, the Senators were defeated in seven games by a Pittsburgh Pirates team led by Pie Traynor, Kiki Cuyler and Max Carey after having taken a 3–1 lead earlier in the series.

The American League MVP award for 1924 and 1925 went to Goslin's teammates Walter Johnson and Roger Peckinpaugh.

1928 batting title

That year, he won the American League batting crown with a career-high .379 batting average. He also finished among the league leaders with a .442 on-base percentage (third best in the league), a .614 slugging percentage (third best), 17 home runs (third best) and 63 extra base hits (fourth best).

The 1928 batting title was not decided until the last day of the season. Goslin and Heinie Manush of the St. Louis Browns were tied going into the final game, and the Senators and Browns played each other in the final game. Goslin was leading Manush when his turn came to bat in the ninth inning. If Goslin made an out, he would lose the batting crown. In Lawrence Ritter's 1966 oral history, "The Glory of Their Times", Goslin described the events that followed. Manager Bucky Harris left the decision to Goslin on whether to bat or sit. Goslin decided to sit and take the batting crown, but his teammates (particularly Joe Judge) goaded him that he would appear yellow if he didn't bat. Goslin was persuaded to bat and promptly took two strikes. At that point, Goslin recalled that he unsuccessfully tried to get ejected from the game, as the at bat would then disappear. Goslin began berating the home plate umpire about the strike calls, only to have the umpire tell him that he was not going to get ejected, and wasn't going to get a walk, so he better step back up and swing. Goslin ended up with what he called a "lucky hit" to beat Manush by a fraction of a point.

Goslin's years with the Browns and return to the Senators

In 1929, Goslin's batting average dropped to .288. Two months into the 1930 season, with Goslin struggling with a .271 batting average, the Senators traded him to the St. Louis Browns for Heinie Manush and Alvin Crowder. Goslin batted .326 with a career-high .652 slugging percentage for the Browns in 1930. In 101 games for the Browns, Goslin had 30 home runs, 100 RBI, and 62 extra base hits. Goslin had another solid year for the Browns in 1931, batting .328 with a career-high 42 doubles, 76 extra base hits and 105 RBI.

While Goslin's average slipped to .299 in 1932, he still drove in 104 runs for the Browns. On Opening Day, April 12, Goslin came up to the plate against the Chicago White Sox with a bat that featured 12 longitudinal green stripes. The bat was thrown out of the game, and on the following day, American League President William Harridge declared the "zebra bat" illegal, as it caused a distraction to the fielding team. At the end of the 1932 season, Goslin was traded back to the Senators. Goslin led the team back to the 1933 World Series. The Senators played in only three World Series in their history, and Goslin played for the Senators in every game of those Series. However, Goslin did not have his usual power in 1933. His 64 RBI and .452 slugging percentage were Goslin's lowest numbers since his rookie season.

The "G-Men" lead Detroit to the 1934 and 1935 World Series

After the Senators lost the 1933 World Series, the Senators traded Goslin to the Detroit Tigers for John Stone. Goslin later recounted that owner Clark Griffith told him that he simply couldn't afford to pay him. Even though the Senators had made it to the World Series, the team was not making money. With stars Charlie Gehringer and Hank Greenberg already in place, the Tigers added future Hall of Famers Goslin and Mickey Cochrane in the off-season. The 1934 Tigers became known as the "G-Men", with the team's top stars being Gehringer, Greenberg and Goslin. The 1934 Tigers sailed to the pennant with a 101–53 record and were matched up in a classic World Series between the "G-Men" and St. Louis's "Gashouse Gang." The Cardinals won a hard-fought seven-game series, which was filled with controversial calls and an infamous play in Game 7 which resulted in the Detroit crowd pelting Joe Medwick with fruit in left field.

Goslin and the Tigers returned to the World Series in 1935. The Tigers won the 1935 World Series on Goslin's game-winning single in the bottom of the ninth inning of Game 6. With the game tied 3–3 in the top of the ninth inning, the Cubs' Stan Hack hit a lead-off triple, but Detroit ace Tommy Bridges struck out the next batter, followed by a ground-out and a fly-out caught by Goslin in left field. In the bottom of the ninth, Goslin came to bat with two outs and Mickey Cochrane on second base. Goslin singled to right, driving in Cochrane for the winning run. Detroit had its first championship, and the "G-Men" were the toast of Detroit.

Goslin is one of only three players to be the last hitter of two World Series, having struck out to end the 1925 World Series and won the 1935 World Series with his walk-off RBI single. Édgar Rentería won the 1997 Series with a walk-off RBI single and ended the 2004 World Series with a ground out to the pitcher. Boss Schmidt of the Detroit Tigers ended the 1907 World Series by popping up and the 1908 World Series by grounding out. Goslin and Mickey Cochrane were the only two non-Yankees in the American League to play in five World Series during the original Yankees dynasty from 1921 to 1964.

Final years in baseball
Goslin played two more seasons with the Tigers in 1936 and 1937, batting .315 in 1936 but dropping to .238 in 1937. On July 28, 1936, Goslin hit one of the most unusual home runs in baseball history. Goslin drove the ball into the gap. The Yankees' right fielder (Joe DiMaggio) and center fielder (Myril Hoag) collided and were knocked unconscious while sprinting for the ball. Goslin rounded the bases with an inside-the-park home run. The Tigers ended up releasing Goslin after his .238 season, and Goslin later recounted (in "The Glory of Their Times") that he received a call from his old boss, Clark Griffith, asking him if he'd be interested in ending his career back where it began in Washington. Goslin jumped at the opportunity and batted .158 in 38 games for the Senators in the 1938 season. In 1939, Goslin became a player-manager for the Trenton Senators of the Interstate League before retiring as a player.

Goslin finished his career after 18 major league seasons with a .316 batting average and a .500 slugging percentage. His 4,325 total bases, 2,735 hits, 921 extra base hits, 1,612 RBI, 500 doubles and 173 triples all rank among the top 50 in each category in major league history. Goslin had 11 seasons with at least 100 RBI, and his league leadership in RBI in 1924 deprived Babe Ruth of the triple crown. He hit .300 or better in 11 seasons in his career.

Goslin holds the record for career home runs at Yankee Stadium (1923–2008) by a visiting player, with 32.

Life after baseball

When he was inducted into the Hall, Goslin broke down and cried. "I have been lucky", he said, "I want to thank God, who gave me the health and strength to compete with these great players. I will never forget this. I will take this to my grave." In 1999, he ranked number 89 on The Sporting News list of Baseball's Greatest Players, and was nominated as a finalist for the Major League Baseball All-Century Team. Goslin ranked #6 on the Sports Illustrated list of The 50 Greatest New Jersey Sports Figures.

After retiring from baseball, Goslin operated a boat rental company on Delaware Bay for many years, until he retired in 1969. He died in Bridgeton, New Jersey, aged 70, and is buried in the Baptist Cemetery, Salem, New Jersey.

See also

 1935 Detroit Tigers season
 List of Major League Baseball career home run leaders
 List of Major League Baseball career hits leaders
 List of Major League Baseball career doubles leaders
 List of Major League Baseball career triples leaders
 List of Major League Baseball career runs scored leaders
 List of Major League Baseball career runs batted in leaders
 List of Major League Baseball career total bases leaders
 List of Major League Baseball players to hit for the cycle
 List of Major League Baseball annual runs batted in leaders
 List of Major League Baseball batting champions
 List of Major League Baseball annual triples leaders
 List of Major League Baseball triples records
 List of Major League Baseball career stolen bases leaders

Further reading

References

External links

, or Retrosheeet

1900 births
1971 deaths
People from Salem, New Jersey
Sportspeople from Salem County, New Jersey
National Baseball Hall of Fame inductees
American League All-Stars
Washington Senators (1901–1960) players
St. Louis Browns players
Detroit Tigers players
Major League Baseball left fielders
People from Bridgeton, New Jersey
Baseball players from New Jersey
American League batting champions
American League RBI champions
Minor league baseball managers
Columbia Comers players
Trenton Senators players
Burials in New Jersey